Matthea Elisabeth Larsen Daughtry is the Assistant Majority Leader of the Maine Senate. She is a Democrat representing Senate District 23, which serves Brunswick, Chebeague Island, Freeport, Harpswell, Pownal, and part of North Yarmouth. Daughtry served as a representative to the Maine House from District 49 from 2012-2020.

Early life and education
Daughtry was born in Brunswick and raised in a politically active family who involved her in volunteering and voter registration.  She remembers an early interest in politics and describes campaigning on Maine Street in Brunswick to be President of the United States when she was six years old. Daughtry's godmother was a state representative when Daughtry was young, and Daughtry worked as a page for her godmother at the State House.

Daughtry attended the Maine Coast Waldorf School and Brunswick High School (BHS), enrolling in classes at Bowdoin College while she was a student at BHS. She continued to Smith College where she majored in Studio Art with a focus in photography and sculpture.

While at Smith, Daughtry worked as a freelance photojournalist at the Times Record in Brunswick and trained with Paul Cunningham. Aspiring to work as an NPR on-air personality, she founded and ran the news department at Smith's student radio station, WOZQ 91.9 FM, and interned in the news department at WFCR in Amherst, Massachusetts. Daughtry also worked for Maine 1st district congressman Tom Allen while she was in college.

After graduating from Smith in 2009,, Daughtry worked as a curator for VSA Arts of Maine and did freelance photography work for Michelle Stapleton. She was doing legislative research and following Maine House races as a communications associate and legislative researcher for the Maine's Majority nonprofit when she first decided to run for office.

Political career

Maine House of Representatives
Daughtry credits her financial difficulties after returning to Maine, and the words of then-governor Paul LePage disparaging young Mainers' financial choices, as a significant motivation for her to run for office. In 2012, when the incumbent state representative for Daughtry's district, Alexander Cornell du Houx, dropped out of the District 66 race following the primary in June, Daughtry decided to run. She won the three-way general election with 45% of the vote, becoming Maine's youngest female legislator at the time.

Daughtry was a member of the Joint Standing Committee on Education and Cultural Affairs and was the House Chair of the Maine Commission on College Affordability and College Completion. On June 12, 2015, Governor Paul LePage vetoed a bill sponsored by Daughtry, LD 537 "An Act To Prohibit Standardized Testing of Children Before Third Grade", as part of his pledge to veto every bill sponsored by a Democrat until they agreed to the elimination of the Maine state income tax. Two days later, the Maine Senate unanimously overruled Governor LePage's veto.

Maine Senate
Daughtry announced her candidacy for Senate District 24 on January 17, 2020. In July 2020, she defeated Stanley Gerzofsky, who had served the district in both the Maine House and Senate since 2000, in the District 24 Democratic primary with almost 80% of the vote.

In the November general election, Daughtry defeated attorney Brad Pattershall with over 66% of the vote. On February 1, 2021, Maine Senate Democrats elected her to serve as Assistant Senate Majority Leader. She was re-elected to the position in November 2022.

Personal life
Daughtry lives in Brunswick with her partner and their coonhound. She co-owns and brews at Moderation Brewing Company in Brunswick, which opened in 2018. Daughtry is also a photographer and writer and owns a media company, Matthea Daughtry Media.

Electoral record

Maine House of Representatives

Maine State Senate

Notes

External links
 
 Maine House Democrats profile
 Matthea Daughtry Media
 Moderation Brewing Company

References

Democratic Party members of the Maine House of Representatives
Living people
Smith College alumni
21st-century American politicians
Brunswick High School (Maine) alumni
Women state legislators in Maine
Politicians from Brunswick, Maine
21st-century American women politicians
1987 births